All Saints Academy or All Saints' Academy may refer to:

England
 All Saints' Academy, Cheltenham, a secondary school in Gloucestershire
 All Saints Academy, Darfield, a primary school in South Yorkshire
 All Saints Academy, Dunstable, a secondary school in Bedfordshire
 All Saints Academy, Ingleby Barwick, a secondary school in North Yorkshire
 All Saints' Catholic Academy, a secondary school in Mansfield, Nottinghamshire
 All Saints Church of England Academy, Plymouth, a secondary school in Devon
 All Saints Church of England Academy, Wyke Regis, a secondary school in Dorset
 ARK All Saints Academy, a secondary school in Southwark, London
 Rossington All Saints Academy, a secondary school in South Yorkshire

United States
 All Saints' Academy (Florida), a preparatory school in Winter Haven, Florida
 All Saints Catholic Academy, in Bayonne, New Jersey

See also
 All Saints College (disambiguation)
 All Saints School (disambiguation)
 All Saints (disambiguation), includes other schools called "All Saints"
 All Saints University (disambiguation)